Three Hours is a 1939 French film directed by Léonide Moguy.

It was known in France as Je t'attendrai.

It was released in the US in 1944.

Cast
Jean-Pierre Aumont
Corinne Luchaire
Édouard Delmont

References

External links

Film page at Uni France

1939 films
French war films
1930s French-language films
Films directed by Léonide Moguy
French black-and-white films
1939 war films
1930s French films